ETB 2 is the second television channel from the Euskal Irrati Telebista group in the Basque Autonomous Community, Navarre and the French Basque Country. The channel broadcasts entirely in Spanish.

The channel launched on 31 May 1986. A HD feed of ETB 2 was launched on 21 December 2016.

Its reception area comprises the whole Basque Country — i.e. the Basque Autonomous Community, Navarre and the Northern Basque Country — and some surrounding places.

History
The channel launched on 31 May 1986, during the first period the channel broadcast in a situation of illegality because all the procedures for its installation were carried out in secret and without the authorization of the national government. After the launch of ETB 2, ETB was the first Spanish regional network to have two television channels.

Programming
Its programming includes: news, interviews, films and documentaries. ETB 2 also stands out for lacking sporting events, since by decision of ETB this programming is broadcast by the rest of the network's channels to favor broadcasts in Basque. On the other hand, the channel favors premiere cinema and news programs to compete with the national channels that broadcast in Spanish. ETB 2 is the channel with the best audience levels of ETB group.

References

External links
Official site of ETB2

EITB
Television stations in Spain
Television channels and stations established in 1986
Spanish-language television stations